Barharwa is a town with a Nagar panchayat in the Rajmahal subdivision of the Sahibganj district in the Indian state of Jharkhand.

Geography

Location
Barharwa is a nagar panchayat.
                                    

Overview
Rajmahal coalfield is shown in the map. The entire area is overwhelmingly rural with only small pockets of urbanisation.

Note: The full screen map is interesting. All places marked on the map are linked and you can easily move on to another page of your choice. Enlarge the map to see what else is there – one gets railway links, many more road links and so on.

Demographics
According to the 2011 Census of India, Barharwa had a total population of 12,617, of which 6,550 (52%) were males and 6,067 (48%) were females. Population in the age range 0–6 years was 1,694. The total number of literate persons in Barharwa was 8,570 (78.46% of the population over 6 years).

A newspaper report says that 9 villages have been added for the formation of Barharwa nagar panchayat in 2016 and the population rose to 24,133. This rise would obviously get reflected in the 2021 census.

Infrastructure
According to the District Census Handbook 2011, Sahibganj, Barharwa covered an area of 4.06 km2. Among the civic amenities, it had 14 km roads with both open and closed drains, the protected water supply involved hand pump, uncovered well. It had 1,189 domestic electric connections, 105 road light points. Among the educational facilities it had 4 primary schools, 5 middle schools, 2 secondary schools, 2 senior secondary schools, 1 general degree college. Among the social, cultural and recreational facilities, it had 2 stadiums, 2 cinema theatres, 1 auditorium/ community hall, 1 public library,1 reading room. Three important commodities it produced were bidi, papad, aachar. It had the branch offices of 2 nationalised banks.

Civic administration

Police station
Barharwa police station serves Barharwa CD block.

CD block HQ
Headquarters of Barharwa CD block is at Barharwa town.

Transport
Barharwa Junction railway station is on the Sahibganj loop. The Barharwa–Azimganj–Katwa loop originates from Barharwa.

Education
B.S.K. College, affiliated with Sido Kanhu Murmu University , was established at Barharwa.

B.S.A. Mahila College, affiliated with Sido Kanhu Murmu University , was established at Barharwa.

References

Cities and towns in Sahibganj district